Michael McCoy (born November 21, 1962) is an American amateur golfer from West Des Moines, Iowa.

McCoy is an insurance executive and is also the 2013 U.S. Mid-Amateur champion. He won the honor in 2013 in Birmingham, Alabama. As U.S. Mid-Amateur champion, McCoy was invited to the 2014 Masters Tournament. He shot 78-83=161 to miss the cut.

McCoy was born in Des Moines, Iowa, and his son Nate, also an amateur golfer, currently acts as his caddy. McCoy's ancestors originally came to the United States from Ireland in the early 1900s, settling first in Pennsylvania before moving to Iowa. He claims his love of golf came from his father who he would travel with on occasion back to the hills of South Armagh in Ireland, to visit relatives and sample some of the golf courses around the mountains of Mourne. He played college golf at Wichita State University.

Among McCoy's golf honors is also a 2009 Amateur Cup win in Iowa.

Tournament wins
this list is probably incomplete
1994 Iowa Open
2000 Trans-Mississippi Amateur
2008 Trans-Mississippi Amateur
2013 U.S. Mid-Amateur

U.S. national team appearances
Amateur
Walker Cup: 2015

References

American male golfers
Amateur golfers
Wichita State Shockers men's golfers
Golfers from Iowa
1962 births
Living people